Sheykh Abdollah (also Romanized as Sheykh ʿAbdollah) is a village in Arzuiyeh Rural District, in the Central District of Arzuiyeh County, Kerman Province, Iran. At the 2006 census, its population was 46, in 10 families.

References 

Populated places in Arzuiyeh County